Stanley and Stanley Common is a civil parish in the Borough of Erewash in Derbyshire, England.  The parish contains three listed buildings that are recorded in the National Heritage List for England.  All the listed buildings are designated at Grade II, the lowest of the three grades, which is applied to "buildings of national importance and special interest".  The parish contains the villages of Stanley and Stanley Common, and the surrounding area.  The listed buildings consist of a church, a cottage and a war memorial.


Buildings

References

Citations

Sources

 

Lists of listed buildings in Derbyshire